Florisvaldo Muniz Barreto (born 9 May 1943) is a Brazilian former footballer.

References

External links
 

1943 births
Living people
Association football goalkeepers
Brazilian footballers
Botafogo de Futebol e Regatas players
Footballers at the 1964 Summer Olympics
Olympic footballers of Brazil